The Young Caruso is a 1951 Italian biographical film about Enrico Caruso, directed by Giacomo Gentilomo.  It stars Ermanno Randi as Enrico Caruso and Gina Lollobrigida. Its original Italian title is Enrico Caruso: leggenda di una voce (Enrico Caruso: Legend of a Voice).

It was produced by Asso Film, Londo Films and Tirenna Film Associata di Roma.  It was adapted from a 1942 novel by Frank Thiess, Neapolitanische Legende (Neapolitan Legend). The film follows the life of the legendary tenor from childhood poverty in Naples to the beginning of his rise to fame. Caruso's voice was provided by Mario Del Monaco and Lollobrigida's voice was dubbed by Dhia Cristiani.

Plot

Cast
 Ermanno Randi as Enrico Caruso
 Gina Lollobrigida 	as Stella
 Ciro Scafa as Luigi Gregorio Proboseide
 Carlo Sposito 	as Giovanni "Gianni" Palma
 Maurizio Di Nardo as Caruso as a boy
 Gaetano Verna as Caruso's father
 Mária Tasnádi Fekete as Anna (Caruso's mother)
 Lamberto Picasso  as Vergine the Maestro
 Nerio Bernardi as Francesco Zucchi
 Gianpaolo Rosmino as Goffredo
 Romano Laurienzo as Gino Saltamerenda 	 	
 Elena Sangro 	as Signora Tivaldi
 Franca Tamantini as Carragi, a soprano
 Mimi Ferrari

Reception
Although an initial commercial success, the film producers knew that the film was almost total fiction; indeed, an introductory title describes the plot as "a poetic interpretation of [Caruso's] youth." The film has thus been called a "travesty" because it had so many biographical inaccuracies. The film greatly upset the Caruso family who ended up suing the producers of the film for five million lire. The family also successfully sued  Metro-Goldwyn-Mayer who was forced to withdraw The Great Caruso from distribution in Italy because of that film's many inaccuracies.

Shortly after the film's release Ermanno Randi was murdered by his lover Giuseppe Maggiore in a jealous rage.

References

External links
 

1951 films
Italian biographical films
1950s historical musical films
Italian historical musical films
1950s Italian-language films
Films set in Italy
Films set in the 19th century
Films about classical music and musicians
Films directed by Giacomo Gentilomo
Cultural depictions of Enrico Caruso
Italian black-and-white films
1950s Italian films